Jesús Alberto Cano Vélez (born 7 August 1950) is a Mexican economist and politician from the Institutional Revolutionary Party. From 2009 to 2012 he served as Deputy of the LXI Legislature of the Mexican Congress representing Sonora.

References

1950 births
Living people
Politicians from Sonora
20th-century Mexican economists
Institutional Revolutionary Party politicians
21st-century Mexican politicians
University of Guadalajara alumni
Academic staff of Universidad de Sonora
People from Magdalena de Kino
Deputies of the LXI Legislature of Mexico
Members of the Chamber of Deputies (Mexico) for Sonora